Aulua or Aulua Bay is an Oceanic language spoken in east Malekula, Vanuatu.

References

Malekula languages
Languages of Vanuatu